Hilary Harkness (born 1971) is an American artist. Her paintings frequently depict surreal worlds inhabited solely by women. She often portrays her female subjects as miniaturized figures set within complexly arranged mechanical or military environments, usually engaged in erotic, violent, or sado-masochistic scenarios. Her work has thus been considered Queer art.

Early life and education

Hilary Harkness was born in Detroit, Michigan. As a toddler, she was fascinated with paintings. Harkness was the daughter of a man who worked at a paper mill and this gave her access to materials to make art. She was encouraged at a young age by her parents and neighbors to paint with watercolors and oil paintings. Later in life, she graduated from UC Berkeley where she studied biochemistry and art. Those art classes sparked her desire to create art and led her to Paris in 1993. There she discovered she wanted to be a painter. Upon her return to the US, Harkness earned an MFA from Yale University in 1996. Despite the prestige associated with Yale University, the artist felt that the school didn't nurture her. Instead, it only gave her a basic tool kit to become an artist. In 2018, she was accepted to participate in the Metropolitan Museum of Art Copyist Program in San Francisco. There she studied and practiced technical skills, and deep observation, with a diverse range of media, including, but not limited to, drawing, painting, and sculpture.

Queer Identity 
	Harkness has proudly self-identified as a lesbian as early as the age of five. Her sex and sexuality clearly influence her art. While Harkness did not struggle with her identity, she did have difficulty living a queer life. She stated that while living in San Francisco, she deeply desired a partner. This caused her to feel lonely and depressed and in response, she imagined worlds full of generically beautiful women. Her works were crowded with figures during this period.  hen she entered her first relationship in 2006, she began creating scenes with fewer characters as she no longer felt lonely within her own life. Later, she bagan dating Ara Tucker, an African American woman. They married in 2015.  Her relationship with a woman of color opened her eyes and shifted her perspective on ideal beauty.  She moved from depicting generic doll-like white women to depicting women of all colors. The development of her queer identity and her personal life is thus reflected in the development of her artwork throughout her career.

Career

Hilary Harkness draws on literature, history, and women’s studies to create detailed technical paintings that some critics say to be unmatched due to the intellectual historical information within each work. Her small paintings are usually priced at $250,000 dollars (USD), making her one of the most highly valued artists per square inch, at just age 31.

Early career: 
In her early artwork. Hilary Harkness created lesbian utopias that are populated exclusively with women depicted in traditional and stereotypically masculine roles. These early artworks consisted of small drawings and oil paintings that are scientifically detailed creating futuristic industrial worlds filled with sexy doll-like figurines as seen in artworks like wavy Sinking the Bismark (2003). The characters within the artworks are not giggling and gossiping rather they are often violent and overtly sexual creating a world where violence and sex are intertwined and have no consequences. Thus, these worlds depict women as free to behave how they truly want to.

Later-present career: 
In the mid-2000s, Hilary Harkness began to change and evolve her signature style with the goal to create medium-sized paintings with calmer compositions, and larger figures. The change within her artwork was motivated by the change within her reality. Harkness fell in love and was in her first long-term female relationship. She shifted her attention from painting hundreds of women to only a few. The shift within her career was slow; it required her to apply different technical styles including a scale to create figures that were less doll-like which can be seen in paintings like Before (2021). Furthermore, her artwork became increasingly political and controversial as she reimagined historical figures and moments with only women, making them homoerotic. The transition within her career from painting chaotic all white doll-like lesbian utopias to recreating or recasting historical events with all female characters and depicting them as a queer society rather than a hetero-patriarchal society was slow, as Harkness was nervous she would no longer be able to make a living due to a sensitive political climate. This change in style may also explain her move from the iconic Mary Boone art gallery to being represented by P.P.O.W. Gallery, which focuses on representing artists that create artworks that explore issues of gender, sexuality, race, and social inequality.

Methodology/Activism
Throughout Hilary Harkness’s career she uses a feminist approach that became increasingly more intersectional throughout her career. She now in order to not just address issues pertaining to gender, sex, power dynamics, sexuality, and eventually race. At the beginning of Harkness’s career, she depicted only white women in her drawings and paintings, excluding women of color. She stated that the lack of inclusion within her earlier cross section paintings is because she wanted the attention to be on gender rather than race. Her early artwork decentered the male position but failed to consider a wider context and include women of all types. The beginning of her career exposes the still-existing structure of colonialism and racism within feminist ideology, most often associated with first and second-wave feminism. 
In 2016, Harkness became determined to interrogate her own position in relation to her artworks, the art world, and overall society. Her current practice is to remove herself and then put herself in other people's shoes, in order to create empathetic depictions. Through this process of looking inwards, Harkness is able to express ideas not only about gender and sexuality, but also race despite not being a woman of color herself.

Series
Harkness has grouped many of her works into series based on style and subject matter.  The series is open-ended; for instance, the first work from the History, some Revisions series, Wishing Well, was done in 1997, and most of the works for the series were created in 1999, but she returned to it in 2018.

Prisoners From the Front

- Arabella and the General (2020)
- Before (2021)
- Prisoners From the Front (1866), Commissioned by Arabella Freeman (2019)
- Request to Quarter: General Francis Channing Barlow visits the home of Arabella Freeman (feat. her brother Charles) (2019)
- Permission Granted (Francis and Harriet) (2019)
- Arabella and the General (2020)
- Heaven (2020)
- Forest Cemetery (2021)

Life with Alice and Gertrude

- Gertrude Stein & Alice B. Toklas, Paris, October, 1939 (2008)
- Night at the Steins: Josephine Baker with "Two Tahitian Women" (2016)
- A Palace for Alice, Le Bateau-Lavoir 1905 (2016)
- Blue Nude with Blonde (2014)
- Blue Nude (2014)
- Matisse Makes a Sale (2012)
- Girl with a Basket of Flowers (2011)
- Woman with the Hat (2011)
- Pleasing Papa: Stein, Hemingway, and Toklas (2010)
- Bride of Stein With Le Bonheur de Vivre (2009)
- Stein and Loos with "Boy Leading a Horse" (2009)
- Morning Glory: Toklas, Stein, Basket, and Pepe (2009)
- Alice at Loggerheads (2009)
- Gertrude Stein & Alice B. Toklas, Paris, October, 1939 (2008)

At Home at War

- Rearguard Action! (2000)
- Balls O’Clock Painting (2015)
- Red Sky in the Morning (2011)
- Fully Committed: Mighty Mo', April 11, 1945 (2008)
- Pomeranian Line (2007)
- Mother lode (2005-2006)
- Pearl Trader (2006)
- Heavy Cruisers (2004)
- Flipwreck (2004)
- Matterhorn (2003-2004)
- Crossing the Equator (2003)
- Iowa Class (2003)
- Drink with the Flies (2002-2003)
- Hell to Pay (2002-2003)
- Deep Roll Dive (2002)
- Sinking the Bismarck (2002)
- Temporary Headquarters (2001)
- Shore Leave (2001)
- Neutral Vessel (2001)
- Taste of Salt (2000)
- Rearguard Action! (2000)

History, some Revisions
- Experienced People Needed (2018)
- Nervous in the Service (2009)
- Golden Gorge (2007)
- Distracted by Expectation (1999)
- Pig Slaughter (1999)
- Clearing After Sudden Rain (1999)
- Study of Uses for Birds in Reproduction (1999)
- Drunk Girl Observing a Flower (1999)
- Spring Torrents (1999)
- Keeping Up Appearances (1999)
- The Want Bone (2008-2009)
- Quarry Works (2008-2009)
- Kiln (1998)
- Dying from home, and lost (1998)
- Wishing Well (1997)

Solo Exhibitions

The FLAG Art Foundation, NYC, NY (2013)
Mary Boone Gallery, NYC, NY (2011)
Mary Boone Gallery, NYC, NY (2008)
Mary Boone Gallery, NYC, NY (2005)
Mary Boone Gallery, NYC, NY (2004)
Daniel Weinberg Gallery, Los Angeles, CA (2002)
Bill Maynes Gallery, NYC, NY (2001)

Awards

Henry Clews Award Master Residency Program, La Napoule Art Foundation (2017)
Rosenthal Family Foundation Award, American Academy of Arts and Letters (2009)
Louis Comfort Tiffany Foundation Award (2003)
Metcalf Award, American Academy of Arts and Letters (2002)

References

Brune, A. M.. “Hilary Harkness: Painting arrested ambiguity at flag art foundation”. HuffPost. (2017, December 7) Retrieved October 10, 2022, from https://www.huffpost.com/entry/hilary-harkness_b_2648475 
Brodsky, D., Jones, M., Kayafas, S., & Myaing, T. “Hilary Harkness”. The Art Grind. Season 4 Episode 52.(2021, January 21)
Heti, Sheila, “The Process,” The Believer Magazine, Sept. 2011. Pg. 32

Honigman, Ana Finel, “Emerging Artists: Sex and Power, Hilary Harkness's Violent Femmes,” Modern Painters, February 2005, pp. 54–55. 
Johns, Merryn, “Bold Strokes: An Out Lesbian Enjoys Acclaim and Controversy”, Curve Magazine, October 2013.
‘JM’, “Hilary Harkness: Artist to Watch,” The Art Economist, 1: no 3 (2011) pg. 73. 
Katy Deepwell, “N. Paradoxa’s 12 Step Guide to Feminist Art, Art History, and Criticism.” N. Paradoxa 21 (September 2010): 4-16.

Maile Arvin, Eve Tuck, and Angie Morrill. “Decolonizing feminism: Challenging connections between settler colonialism and heteropatriarchy.” Feminist Formations 25, no. 1 (2013): 8-34.

Living people
1971 births
Queer artists
Yale University alumni
University of California, Berkeley alumni
American lesbian artists